The Anji Khad bridge is an under-construction cable-stayed bridge connecting Katra and Reasi Section of Jammu–Baramulla line. After an earlier  arch bridge design proposal, similar to the Chenab Bridge arch design, was rejected and a new cable-stayed design was approved, it became India's first cable-stayed railway bridge. It is built by Hindustan Construction Company.

History

Arch Bridge design proposal: rejected 
The Anji Khad bridge was initially proposed to be an arch bridge. It was designed as a long steel arches span bridge. The  bridge lies southeast of the Chenab Bridge, near Reasi, along which the alignment of the new railway line crosses the deep gorges of Anji Khad. Quality aspects, construction standards, indigenous materials and the painting scheme were proposed to be similar to the Chenab Bridge. Later, a committee headed by a former railway board chairman has recommended that the location is not suitable for an arch bridge.

Cable-stayed bridge design proposal: accepted 
In October 2016, Indian Railways decided to build a cable-stayed bridge at Anji Khad. The plan to build an arch bridge similar to the Chenab bridge was abandoned due to the vulnerability of the structure primarily due to concerns over geological stability of the region. The proposed bridge will connect tunnel T2 on Katra side and tunnel T3 on Reasi side. The ₹458 crore project consists of 290 metres span at a height of 196 metres. The length of bridge’s main section is 473.25 meter long out of the total length over 1,300 meters with 120 meter long viaduct. The bridge is supported by 96 cables.

Design
The basic design proposed by a foreign firm is used. The head of the construction of Northern Railways has informed that the detailed design is being worked out.

Status updates
 January 2017: HCC to construct cable-stayed Anji Khad Bridge. The work will complete in 36 months.

 March 2021: Bridge design entails a single pylon, the construction of this pylon has been completed.

 January 2022: the bridge will be completed within a year, i.e. by december 2022.

See also
 
 
 Chenab Bridge

References

Deck arch bridges
Bridges under construction
Railway bridges in India
Bridges in Jammu and Kashmir
Bridges over the Chenab River
Reasi district
Proposed bridges in India
Proposed rail infrastructure in India